A list of films produced in the United Kingdom in 1978 (see 1978 in film):

1978

See also
1978 in British music
1978 in British radio
1978 in British television
1978 in the United Kingdom

References

External links
 

1978
Films
British